American singer and songwriter Ava Max has received numerous awards and nominations since her international breakthrough with the release of "Sweet but Psycho" in 2018. Max is the recipient of one Attitude Award, one iHeartRadio Titanium Award, four Los 40 Music Awards, one MTV Europe Music Award, one Swiss Music Award and one TopHit Music Award. Her debut studio album, Heaven & Hell, was released by Atlantic in September 2020. The record was preceded by eight singles, including "Sweet but Psycho", which won the award for the Best International Song at the 2019 Los 40 Music Awards and was selected as one of the winning songs at the 2020 iHeartRadio Titanium Awards, "Kings & Queens", which received nominations for the Best International Video at the 2020 Los 40 Music Awards and for the International Song of the Year at the 2020 NRJ Music Award.

Awards and nominations

Other accolades

Notes

References

External links 

Awards
Max, Ava